Comstock Township may refer to the following places in the United States:

 Comstock Township, Michigan
 Comstock Township, Minnesota
 Comstock Township, Custer County, Nebraska

Township name disambiguation pages